Enhamed Enhamed Mohamed Yahdih (born 11 September 1987 in Las Palmas, Canary Islands) is a Paralympic swimmer from Spain.  He is an B1/S11 type swimmer.

Personal 
Enhamed is blind. A motivational speaker, Enhamed likes to describe the moment that he became blind at the age of eight, as "the day I won my blindness". His family immigrated to Spain from Morocco.

Swimming 
A vision impaired swimmer, he has a "tapper" who taps him so he knows when he has to initiate a turn in the water.

In 2010, he raced at the Tenerife International Open.  Before the 2010 Adapted Swimming World Championship in the Netherlands, he went to a swimming camp with the national team that was part of the Paralympic High Performance Program (HARP Program). He raced at the 2011 IPC European Swimming Championships in Berlin, Germany.

Paralympics 
He raced at the 2004 Summer Paralympics.  He finished third in the 400 meter Freestyle and 100 meter Butterfly races. He raced at the 2008 Summer Paralympics. He won a gold medal in the 50 meter Freestyle, 100 meter Freestyle and 400 meter Freestyle races.  He won a g gold medal  in the 100 meter Butterfly race. He raced at the 2012 Summer Paralympics.  He was the number two person to finish in the 400 meter Freestyle race. He won a  bronze medal  in the 50 meter Freestyle and the 100 meter Butterfly races. He won four gold medals in the Beijing and two in Athens Paralympic Games.  He competed at the 2012 Summer Paralympics. Prior to heading to London, he participated in a national vision impaired swim team training camp at the High Performance Centre of Sant Cugat from 6 to 23 August.  Daily at the camp, there were two in water training sessions and one out of water training session.

References

External links 
 
 

1987 births
Living people
Sportspeople from Las Palmas
Paralympic swimmers of Spain
Paralympic gold medalists for Spain
Paralympic silver medalists for Spain
Paralympic bronze medalists for Spain
Paralympic medalists in swimming
Paralympic swimmers with a vision impairment
S11-classified Paralympic swimmers
Swimmers at the 2004 Summer Paralympics
Swimmers at the 2008 Summer Paralympics
Swimmers at the 2012 Summer Paralympics
Medalists at the 2004 Summer Paralympics
Medalists at the 2008 Summer Paralympics
Medalists at the 2012 Summer Paralympics
Spanish sportspeople of Moroccan descent
Medalists at the World Para Swimming Championships
Spanish blind people